BC Odesa is a Ukrainian professional basketball club based in Odesa. The club competed in the Ukrainian Basketball SuperLeague (UBSL). 

Established in 1992, Odesa played in the SuperLeague for most of its existence until it disappeared in 2016. In 2018, the club was re-founded when it merged with BC Dynamo Odesa.

History
BC Odesa was one of the most distinguished basketball clubs in the country and has won the UBSL championship 4 times. It was founded in 1992 under the name BIPA-Moda after its sponsor company. Following the death of its 1st president Arkadiy Tabachnyk in 1999, the club became municipal and, hence, changed its name to MBC Odesa. In 2006, the club turned private again after its purchase by the current president Oleh Bychkov, and its name was changed to the present BC Odesa. After the 2015–16 season, the club disappeared. However, another club BIPA Odesa played in the SuperLeague the following years.

In the summer of 2018, BC Dynamo Odesa, winner of the second-tier division, was renamed and merged to BC Odesa. Previously, BIPA Odesa was merged to BC Dynamo Odesa in 2017.

Season by season

Since re-foundation in 2018

Players

Hall of Fame

Notable players

Head coaches
  Vitaliy Lebedyntsev: 1992–1996, 1998–2001, 2008–2010
  Yuriy Selikhov: 1996–1998
  Valiantsin Varonin
  Oleh Yushkin: 2010–2015

Honors

Domestic competitions
 Ukrainian Super League
Champions (4): 1997–98, 1998–99, 2000–01, 2001–02
Ukrainian Cup
Champions (2): 1993, 2001
Runners-up: 2019

International competitions
NEBL Challenge Cup
Winners (1): 2001

References

External links
Official Website BC Odesa

Basketball teams in Ukraine
Sport in Odesa
Basketball teams established in 1992
1992 establishments in Ukraine